Jonathan Soares is a South African rugby league player for the Tuks Bulls in the Rhino Cup. His position is second row. He is a South African international, and has played in the 2013 Rugby League World Cup qualifying against Jamaica and the USA.

References

South African rugby league players
South Africa national rugby league team players
Tuks Bulls players
Living people
Year of birth missing (living people)